Nemoria unitaria, the single-lined emerald, is a species of emerald moth in the family Geometridae. It is found in North America.

The MONA or Hodges number for Nemoria unitaria is 7018.

References

Further reading

External links

 

Geometrinae
Articles created by Qbugbot
Moths described in 1873